Selwyn Eric Belsham (28 September 1930 – 11 March 2016) was a New Zealand rugby league player who represented New Zealand at the 1957 World Cup. He also played cricket for Auckland.

His brother Vic was also a New Zealand national rugby league team representative. Vic later became a referee, controlling his brother's team in the 1957 World Cup. Their father Alf represented Auckland in rugby union.

Sporting career

Rugby league
An Auckland representative, Belsham played for the Richmond club in the Auckland Rugby League competition. He represented the North Island on three occasions, in 1955, 1956 and 1957.

Belsham represented the New Zealand national rugby league team, playing 10 consecutive test matches between 1955 and 1957. He was first selected for the 1955 tour of Great Britain and France, but began the trip with a broken collarbone, suffered in New Zealand. He played in only two games during the England leg of the trip before making his test debut in the first test against France.

Belsham played for the Rest of the World against Australia after the 1957 World Cup. His final test match was for New Zealand against a combined Great Britain-France side.

Cricket
Belsham played six first-class cricket matches for Auckland as a wicket-keeper, taking 13 catches and four stumpings. With the bat, he scored 105 runs at an average of 11.66 and a high score of 41.

Death
Belsham died in Queensland, Australia, on 11 March 2016.

See also
 List of Auckland representative cricketers

References

1930 births
2016 deaths
New Zealand rugby league players
New Zealand national rugby league team players
Auckland rugby league team players
New Zealand cricketers
Auckland cricketers
North Island rugby league team players
Richmond Bulldogs players
Rugby league halfbacks
Wicket-keepers